Te Ao Mārama is a concept of the world in Māori traditional knowledge. Te Ao Mārama may also refer to:

Places 
Te Ao Marama, the Ngāi Tahu name for Lake Benmore
Te Ao Marama, a wharenui at Onetahua Kōkiri Marae in Tākaka, Golden Bay / Mohua
Te Ao Mārama, the wharekai (dining hall) at Te Ao Hou Marae, Aramoho, Whanganui
Te Ao Mārama School in Flagstaff, Hamilton
Te Ao Mārama, the bicultural atrium space at the Auckland War Memorial Museum

Music 
Te Ao Mārama (EP) a 2021 extended play by Lorde
"Te Ao Mārama / Solar Power", the Māori language version of the song "Solar Power" by Lorde

Other 
Te Ao Mārama a current affairs television programme on Māori Television